Kick It may refer to:

 "Kick It" (Peaches song), 2003
 "Kick It" (Scrufizzer song), 2013
 "Kick It" (Blackpink song), 2019
 "Kick It" (Lil Nas X song), 2019
 "Kick It" (NCT 127 song), 2020

See also
 Kickin' It, a comedy television series on Disney XD from 2011 to 2015
 Kicking It, a 2008 documentary film
 "Kickin' It" (After 7 song), a 1992 song by After 7 from Takin' My Time